Amersham, often spelt as Agmondesham, was a constituency of the House of Commons of England until 1707, then in the House of Commons of Great Britain from 1707 to 1800 and finally in the House of Commons of the United Kingdom from 1801 to 1832. It was represented by two Members of Parliament (MPs), elected by the bloc-vote system.

Boundaries
The constituency was a parliamentary borough in Buckinghamshire, covering part of the small town of Amersham. It is located 2 miles north west of London, in the Chiltern Hills of England. Davis describes it as "a thriving little market town".

Before the borough was re-enfranchised in 1120 and after it was disenfranchised in 1832, the area was represented as part of the county constituency of Buckinghamshire.

History
The borough was first enfranchised in 1300, but only seems to have sent burgesses to Parliament for a short time. By 1307 it was no longer included in the list of Parliamentary boroughs. In the 17th century a solicitor named William Hakewill, of Lincoln's Inn, rediscovered ancient writs confirming that Amersham, Great Marlow, and Wendover had all sent members to Parliament in the past, and succeeded in re-establishing their privileges (despite the opposition of James I), so that they resumed electing members from the Parliament of 1624. Hakewill himself was elected for Amersham in 1624.

The right of election was held by householders paying scot and lot, a local tax. This was one of the most democratic franchises used in elections to the Unreformed House of Commons. However, because this was a small borough, from the seventeenth to the nineteenth centuries, it was under the patronage of the Drake family of Shardeloes (an estate about a mile from the town).

In the early eighteenth century, there were about 150 electors. Although, at this period, the Drakes did not own most of the houses, they were able to nominate candidates for both seats. An anti-Drake element in the electorate supported a candidate in opposition to the Tory candidates promoted by the Drake interest, at elections in 1728, 1734 and 1735. That opposition proved to represent about a third of the electorate.

Thereafter the Drakes enjoyed unchallenged possession of their pocket borough. There was no further sign of the sort of resistance to the dominant interest that broke out from time to time in many similar boroughs.

By the latter half of the eighteenth century, the Drakes owned most of the town. The number of voters were reduced to about 70. Elections were all uncontested.

The borough was treated with respect by its patrons. Uncontested elections were accompanied by generous expenditure, estimated by Davis as £350 in the eighteenth century and £600 in the 1820s.

Amersham was one of the boroughs totally disenfranchised by the Reform Act 1832. The 1831 census had shown that the population of the borough was 1,347, and there were 247 houses (although the whole town of Amersham had 360 houses).

Members of Parliament

Not represented in the First and Second Protectorate Parliaments; returned two members for the Third Protectorate Parliament.

Constituency disenfranchised (1832)

Elections

General notes
In multi-member elections the bloc voting system was used. Voters could cast a vote for one or two candidates, as they chose. The leading candidates with the largest number of votes were elected.

In by-elections, to fill a single seat, the first past the post system applied.

Where a party had more than one candidate in one or both of a pair of successive elections change is calculated for each individual candidate, otherwise change is based on the party vote. Change figures at by-elections are from the preceding general election or the last intervening by-election.  Change figures at general elections are from the last general election.

Candidates for whom no party has been identified are classified as Non Partisan. The candidate might have been associated with a party or faction in Parliament or considered himself to belong to a particular political tradition. Political parties before the nineteenth century were not as cohesive or organised as they later became. Contemporary commentators (even the reputed leaders of parties or factions) in the eighteenth century did not necessarily agree who the party supporters were. The traditional parties, which had arisen in the late seventeenth century, became increasingly irrelevant to politics in the eighteenth century (particularly after 1760), although for some contests in some constituencies party labels were still used. It was only towards the end of the century that party labels began to acquire some meaning again, although this process was by no means complete for several more generations.

Sources: The results for elections before 1790 were taken from the History of Parliament Trust publications on the House of Commons. The results from 1790 until 1832 are based on Stooks Smith. Where Stooks Smith gives additional information to the other sources this is indicated in a note.

Dates of elections 1660–1715
-- Apr 1660 GE
23 Mar 1661 GE
-1 Nov 1669 BE
-4 Feb 1679 GE
-- --- 1679 GE
29 Jan 1681 GE
23 Mar 1685 GE
-5 Jan 1689 GE
-- --- 1690 GE
-8 Oct 1690 BE
-9 Nov 1691 BE
21 Oct 1695 GE
21 Jul 1698 GE
-2 Jan 1699 BE
-7 Jan 1701 GE
19 Feb 1701 BE
10 Mar 1701 BE
21 Nov 1701 GE
14 Nov 1702 GE
-8 May 1705 GE
21 Nov 1707 BE
-4 May 1708 GE
-3 Oct 1710 GE
27 Aug 1713 GE
18 Mar 1714 BE

Election results 1715–1832
As with most boroughs in the unreformed House of Commons, Amersham was uncontested at most elections. The only known contested elections after 1715 were those of 1728, 1735 and 1736.

Death of Fermanagh 23 June 1717

Choice of Drake to sit for Buckinghamshire

Choice of Leveson Gower to sit for Newcastle-under-Lyme

Death of Drake 26 April 1728

 (Note May 1728): Drake, the late MP, had been the owner of the largest interest in the constituency. His heir was a child and the anti-Drake element in the borough took advantage of the opportunity to contest the seat. Only about a third of the votes were cast for the challenger.

 (Note 1734): Thomas Bladen stood for the anti-Drake forces in the borough. The result again suggested that only about a third of the electorate opposed the borough's long term patrons.
Death of Lutwyche 13 November 1734

 (Note 1735): The vote totals are unknown, but Gore won and no further contested elections took place during the remaining 97 years when the borough returned MPs.

 Appointment of Gore as Commissary General of the Musters (he was returned for Portsmouth)

 Death of Marshall 2 February 1754

 Death of Garrard

-- --- 1790 GE
-4 Jun 1795 BE
26 May 1796 GE
-- --- 1802 GE
31 Jan 1805 BE
-- --- 1806 GE
-- --- 1807 GE
21 Nov 1810 BE
-- --- 1812 GE
-- --- 1818 GE
-- --- 1820 GE
-- --- 1826 GE

See also
 List of former United Kingdom Parliament constituencies
 Chesham and Amersham (UK Parliament constituency) constituency created in 1974

References
 
 Political Change and Continuity 1760-1885: A Buckinghamshire Study, by Richard W. Davis (David and Charles 1972)
 The House of Commons 1715-1754, by Romney Sedgwick (HMSO 1970)
 The House of Commons 1754-1790, by Sir Lewis Namier and John Brooke (HMSO 1964)
 The Parliaments of England by Henry Stooks Smith (1st edition published in three volumes 1844–50), second edition edited (in one volume) by F.W.S. Craig (Political Reference Publications 1973)
 Members of the Long Parliament by D Brunton & D H Pennington (London: George Allen & Unwin, 1954)
 Parliamentary Representation 1832 — England and Wales by J Holladay Philbin (New Haven: Yale University Press, 1965)

Amersham
Parliamentary constituencies in Buckinghamshire (historic)
Constituencies of the Parliament of the United Kingdom established in 1625
Constituencies of the Parliament of the United Kingdom disestablished in 1832
Rotten boroughs